Ateez (stylized as ATEEZ) is a South Korean boy band formed by KQ Entertainment. The group consists of eight members: Hongjoong, Seonghwa, Yunho, Yeosang, San, Mingi, Wooyoung and Jongho. They debuted on October 24, 2018, with the extended play (EP) Treasure EP.1: All to Zero.

Ateez were named Worldwide Fans' Choice at the 2019 and 2020 Mnet Asian Music Awards, and won the Bonsang (main award) at the 4th The Fact Music Awards, the 30th and 31st Seoul Music Awards.

As of January 2023, Ateez have released nine EPs, one studio album and one single album in the Korean language, as well as three EP and two studio albums in the Japanese language. Their records Treasure EP.Fin: All to Action, Treasure Epilogue: Action to Answer, Zero: Fever Part.1, Zero: Fever Part.2, Zero: Fever Epilogue and The World EP.1: Movement each topped the South Korean Gaon Album Chart, with Zero: Fever Part. 1 becoming the group's first to be certified platinum in the country. Ateez have sold over four million physical albums worldwide. Often referred to as "Global Performance Idols" by Korean media and dubbed "4th Generation Leaders" by the Korean Ministry of Culture, Sports, and Tourism, the group has also served as official global ambassadors for Korean culture and tourism.

History

2016–2018: Formation, pre-debut activities, and Treasure EP.1
Plans for a new KQ Entertainment boy band began after a staff member discovered a letter and sample mixtape from Kim Hongjoong, who would eventually become Ateez's leader, expressing interest in becoming a trainee at the company due to his admiration of Block B, a group also managed by KQ Entertainment. Hongjoong became the company's first official trainee and would remain the only one until Yunho joined six months later. Over the next year, members Mingi, San, Seonghwa, Yeosang, Jongho, and Wooyoung joined KQ Entertainment as trainees. Many had previous training experience at other companies: Mingi at Maroo Entertainment, Jongho at TOP Media, and Yeosang and Wooyoung who trained at Big Hit Entertainment together.

In late 2017, Hongjoong, Mingi, Wooyoung, and Jongho competed on the survival reality show Mix Nine, placing 42nd, 63rd, 72nd, and 43rd respectively out of all male contestants. Prior to debuting, trainees under KQ Entertainment were known as "KQ Fellaz". On May 18, 2018, KQ Entertainment released the YouTube video "KQ Fellaz Performance Video I", which featured all eight Ateez members together for the first time, dancing to the song "Pick It Up" by rapper Famous Dex. Shortly after, the group premiered their pre-debut web series, KQ Fellaz American Training, showcasing the eight members traveling to Los Angeles, California, to train in dance at The Millennium Dance Complex. During this period, a ninth trainee, Lee Junyoung, was promoted as a member of KQ Fellaz but ultimately not added to the final lineup. For the finale of the web series, KQ Fellaz released the music video of "From", a song composed and produced by Hongjoong.

KQ Entertainment announced a debut reality show with a set of three teasers. The second teaser, released on July 3, 2018, revealed the official name for the group: Ateez. The show, Code Name Is Ateez, premiered on Mnet on July 20.

On October 24, 2018, Ateez released their debut EP, Treasure EP.1: All to Zero, alongside music videos for the two lead singles "Pirate King" (Korean: 해적왕; RR: Haejeogwang) and "Treasure". Their debut showcase was held on the same day. The album peaked at number seven on the weekly Gaon Albums Chart, selling 23,644 copies in 2018.

2019: Breakthrough, first tour, and first studio album 
On January 3, 2019, Ateez announced their first comeback EP, Treasure EP.2: Zero to One, with a teaser photo on their social media accounts. The EP was released on January 15, alongside a music video for the lead single "Say My Name". A music video for the track "Hala Hala (Hearts Awakened, Live Alive)" from the EP was released on February 7.

On January 24, Ateez announced their first tour, The Expedition Tour, with March dates in five American cities: New York City, Chicago, Dallas, Atlanta, and Los Angeles. The tour was then extended through April with the addition of European shows in London, Lisbon, Paris, Berlin, Amsterdam, Milan, Budapest, Stockholm, Warsaw, and Moscow. All American and European shows reportedly sold out. On May 17, Ateez performed at their first joint K-pop concert, KCON 2019 Japan, in Chiba, Japan. In early June, The Expedition Tour was extended again, this time visiting Australian cities Melbourne and Sydney in August.

Ateez released their third EP, Treasure EP.3: One to All, on June 10. The lead single, "Wave", was selected via fan vote, winning in the competition over "Illusion". Music videos for both songs were released on the same day. On June 20, Ateez won their first music program award on M Countdown for "Wave", winning a second time on The Show five days later. On July 8, music video for the track "Aurora" was released. Ateez performed at KCON events in New York City and Los Angeles in July and August respectively, and received the Soribada Award for Best Performance on August 20.

On September 18, Ateez announced their third comeback with Treasure EP.Fin: All to Action, their first studio album. It was released on October 8 with a music video for lead single "Wonderland". The album sold 165,479 physical copies in South Korea in 2019 and became the first Ateez album to reach number one on the weekly Gaon Albums Chart. On November 3, Ateez won the Best Korean Act award at the 2019 MTV Europe Music Awards.

On November 10, they released their first Japanese-language music video for the song "Utopia", originally a track on Treasure EP.3. On December 4, their debut Japanese album Treasure EP. Extra: Shift the Map was released, and they won the Worldwide Fans' Choice Award at the Mnet Asian Music Awards in Nagoya, Japan on the same day.

2020: Conclusion of Treasure series and start of Fever era 
On January 6, 2020, Ateez released their fourth EP, Treasure Epilogue: Action to Answer, as the conclusion to their Treasure series, alongside a music video for lead single "Answer". The EP sold 179,796 physical copies in South Korea in 2020. On February 12, Ateez released their first Japanese EP Treasure EP.Map to Answer, with the Japanese version of "Answer" as the lead single.

The group's second world tour, The Fellowship: Map the Treasure, was scheduled to begin in Seoul in February before reaching seven European cities in March and two Japanese cities and five American cities in April. The Seoul tour dates were held as planned on February 8 and 9. However, due to concerns over the COVID-19 pandemic, the remaining tour dates were indefinitely postponed. Several tour dates had already been sold out; the shows in Amsterdam, Madrid, and Moscow were reportedly since January. All dates in United States were also sold out, including some arenas with capacities of over 18,000 people.

Due to COVID-19 restrictions, Ateez hosted a free, virtual concert called "Crescent Party" on the V Live app, with over 1.4 million viewers tuning into the live event on May 30. On June 26, they performed both the opening and closing stages at KCON:TACT 2020 and held their first virtual meet-and-greet with fans.

On July 4, Ateez released a promotional schedule for their fifth EP, Zero: Fever Part.1, their first release following the conclusion of the Treasure series. The lead single, "Inception", was voted by fans over the track "Thanxx". The EP was released on July 29, and Ateez received their third and fourth music program awards for "Inception" on August 4 and 5, on The Show and Show Champion. Music video of the other single, "Thanxx", was released on August 24. Zero: Fever Part. 1 sold 379,052 physical copies in South Korea in 2020, which was Ateez's first album to be certified platinum by the Korea Music Content Association, as well as making Ateez the second fourth-generation boy group to generate one million total sales as rookies.

On August 29, Ateez appeared on the South Korean television program Immortal Songs: Singing the Legend. They performed a cover of Turbo's "The Black Cat Nero" and won the episode, making them the first fourth-generation group and the sixth idol group overall to win on the program. On October 31, Ateez released a special Halloween music video version of "The Black Cat Nero", featuring the original artist Kim Jong-kook.

On November 15, it was announced that member Mingi would temporarily suspend promotional activities with the group in order to receive treatment for and recover from symptoms of psychological anxiety.

At the 2020 Mnet Asian Music Awards, Ateez won the Worldwide Fans' Choice and Discovery of the Year awards. During their performance at the show, it was announced that they would be joining The Boyz and Stray Kids on the inaugural season of Kingdom: Legendary War, an Mnet competition show which aired in April 2021.

On December 19, Ateez were the only idol group invited to the Immortal Songs year-end finale "King of Kings", where they performed their version of Seo Taiji and Boys' "Anyhow Song". According to an official Twitter survey, Ateez were the fifth most tweeted-about musician in the United States in 2020, after BTS, Kanye West, Beyoncé, and Drake, and the 10th most tweeted-about K-pop group in the world.

2021: Fever series, Kingdom and domestic promotions 
On January 31, Ateez received their first Bonsang (main award) since debut on the 30th Seoul Music Awards. They returned to Immortal Songs: Singing the Legend for a third time and won the episode on February 6 by performing a rendition of Rain's "It's Raining", making them the only K-pop boy group with multiple wins on the program.

On March 1, their sixth EP, Zero: Fever Part.2, was released with a music video for promoted single "Fireworks (I'm the One)" (Korean: 불놀이야; RR: Bulnoriya). Ateez received their fifth music show win on The Show on March 9 for the song. Zero: Fever Part.2 was certified double platinum on July 8, having sold over 500,000 copies. On March 24, Ateez released their first original Japanese studio album Into the A to Z with "Still Here" as the lead single.

In addition to their music releases, the group and individual members participated in various Korean television programs. In March, Yeosang became a co-host of SBS MTV's music program The Show. Meanwhile, Yunho, Jongho, Seonghwa, and San were cast in the KBS2 television drama Imitation, which aired from May to July. The competition show Kingdom: Legendary War that Ateez participated in alongside five other K-pop boy groups first aired on April 1. For the final round, they released the song "멋 (The Real)" on May 28, which Mingi participated in recording but not performing. The group finished in third place overall. On May 22, Ateez returned to Immortal Songs for a fourth time, winning with their performance of Psy's "Right Now" and consequently tying with Mamamoo for most wins by a idol group on the show.

On July 9, KQ Entertainment confirmed that San tested positive but was asymptomatic for COVID-19. All members except Mingi suspended their activities to enter self-isolation until July 23, and San stayed at a treatment center until he was released on July 19. On July 19, it was announced that Mingi would be returning to group activities.

On July 28, Ateez released their first Japanese single "Dreamers", which served as the fifth ending theme for the 2020 reboot anime series Digimon Adventure. On August 4, Ateez announced an album collaboration with Kim Jong-kook titled Season Songs, with lead single "Be My Lover" (Korean: 바다 보러 갈래?; RR: Bada Boreo Gallae?), which was released on August 16. On August 19, it was announced that Ateez collaborated with American a cappella group Pentatonix on the single "A Little Space", set for digital release the following day.

On September 13, Ateez released their seventh EP, Zero: Fever Part.3. The lead single "Deja Vu" was voted on by fans over the track "Eternal Sunshine". Pre-orders for the EP surpassed 800,000 copies, more than double that of their last release. It debuted at number one on the Billboard World Albums Chart, and the group reached a new peak on the Billboard World Digital Songs Chart with "Deja Vu" charting at number four. The EP debuted at number 42 on the Billboard 200, their first appearance on the chart. Ateez also topped the Billboard Emerging Artists Chart. Domestically, they received their sixth music show win on MBC M's Show Champion for "Deja Vu" on September 22. The EP received double platinum certification on November 11, having surpassed the 500,000 copies sales mark.

On October 2, Ateez won the Artist of the Year award on The Fact Music Awards. On October 31, They performed at the SBS Super Concert in Daegu, where Yunho was appointed as one of the hosts. On November 14, it was announced on their virtual concert "Fever: eXendtion edition" that the group's third world tour, The Fellowship: Beginning of the End, would be held in 2022. The world tour was scheduled to begin with three dates in Seoul in early January and proceed to five cities in the US in the latter part of the month before concluding on March 1 after shows in six European cities.

On December 10, Ateez released their eighth EP, Zero: Fever Epilogue, featuring the lead singles "Turbulence" (Korean: 야간비행; RR: Yaganbihaeng) and "The Real (Heung version)" (Korean: 멋 (흥 ver.); RR: Meot (Heung ver.)). The album included tracks previously introduced as performances on Kingdom, and was certified platinum. On December 25, Ateez made a return to Immortal Songs year-end finale "King of Kings" with a mashup of Block B's "Nillili Mambo", Big Bang's "Fantastic Baby", and their own song "The Real (Heung version)".

2022: Two world tours, Beyond: Zero, The World EP.1: Movement, The World EP.Paradigm and Spin Off: From the Witness 
Ateez held their first offline concerts in two years in Seoul from January 7 to 9. 'The Fellowship: Beginning of the End' world tour continued with six sold-out shows in Chicago, Atlanta, Newark, Dallas and Los Angeles in the United States in January. On January 18, it was announced that Yeosang would continue his role as co-host of The Show for a second year. On January 23, Ateez won the main award on the 31st Seoul Music Awards.

On January 31, they released the promotional single "Don't Stop" through Universe Music for the platform Universe. On February 3, it was announced that Ateez would appear on 'Global Spin Live' at the Grammy Museum on February 8. They performed and participated in an interview, as well as an audience question-and-answer segment on the live event.

The European leg of the "Beginning of The End" world tour was rescheduled to late April and May, in which eight shows in Madrid, London, Paris, Berlin and Amsterdam were held, while the Warsaw show was canceled. Three additional shows in Yokohama, Japan in mid July were also announced.

On May 25, Ateez released their second Japanese EP, Beyond: Zero, with lead single "Rocky (Boxers Ver.)". The EP charted at number two on the Oricon weekly album chart, Line Music weekly album chart and Billboard Japan Top Album Sales chart.

On June 30, they performed at the Jeddah K-pop Festival in Saudi Arabia. On July 3, they closed the second day of UNI-KON 2022 in Seoul.

On July 29, Ateez released their ninth Korean EP The World EP.1: Movement, featuring the lead single "Guerrilla". Pre-orders exceeded 1.1 million copies, making it their first million seller EP. Album sales on the first week was over 930,000 physical copies, and the EP topped South Korea's Circle Album Chart for two consecutive weeks. The album charted at number three on Billboard 200 in the United States, which was Ateez's first top 10 on the main chart. The group wrapped up their album promotion with a total of six music program awards for "Guerrilla", grabbing first places on The Show, Show Champion and Music Bank.

On August 22, Ateez performed at KCON 2022 LA, and were appointed to interpret and perform the LA version of KCON 2022's signature song "Poppia". On September 8, it was reported that Hongjoong and Yunho have been chosen as DJs for MBC Radio's Idol Radio Season 3, and that the show would incorporate Ateez's colors by adopting a "space pirate" concept. On September 9, Ateez released an original soundtrack for the web drama Mimicus named "Let's Get Together". Jongho then released his first solo OST "A Fairy Tale of Youth" for TVING's variety show Young Actor's Retreat on September 16.

Ateez performed in several joint concerts across Asia during September and October, including Kpop Land 2022 in Jakarta, K-pop Masterz Ep.2 in Manila and Bangkok, KCON 2022 Saudi Arabia in Riyadh, Powerful Daegu K-pop Concert Restart, and KCON 2022 Japan in Tokyo. On October 8, Ateez received the Artist of The Year Bonsang, as well as the Best Performer award at The Fact Music Awards.

Ateez started off their second world tour of the year "The Fellowship: Break The Wall" with two sold-out concerts in Seoul on October 29 and 30. They then carried on with the North America leg of the tour, comprising eleven shows in Oakland, Anaheim, Phoenix, Dallas, Chicago, Atlanta, Newark and Toronto. They finished the 2022 part of this tour with two shows in Chiba, Japan. KQ Fellaz 2, a pre-debut group from the same label as ATEEZ, were the opening act of all the shows except for the one in Canada, presenting to the audience their two pre-debut songs. On November 26, Jongho released the OST "Gravity" for the JTBC drama Reborn Rich.

On November 30, Ateez released their third Japanese EP, The World EP.Paradigm, featuring the lead single "Paradigm". It ranked first on the Oricon weekly album chart as well as on the Oricon Weekly Combined Album Chart. The album also ranked first on Billboard Japan Top Album Sales with 124,584 physical copies sold in the first week, making it Ateez' first EP to top these charts.

On December 7, they released their OST "Like That" for the anime Lookism, adaptation of the eponymous webtoon. On December 15, it was announced that the group would release the opening theme "Limitless" for the anime Duel Masters WIN.

On December 22, 2022, the agency released a comeback trailer for their first single album in Korea, Spin Off: From the Witness, which was released on December 30, 2022 with its lead single "Halazia". The single album made the group enter Billboard 200's top 10 at number seven and Billboard's Top Album Sales's Top 10 at number 2, making it respectively their third and second time on the two charts. Halazia brought them their 13th music show win on KBS' Music Bank on January 6.

2023: Continuation of the "Break The Wall" world tour 
After finishing their domestic promotion of Spin Off: From the Witness, Ateez held promotional activities, including two showcases, in Japan for their EP The World EP. Paradigm from January 29th to February 3rd. On February 10, the group kicked off the Europe leg of the "Break The Wall" world tour in Amsterdam, followed by eight shows in Berlin, Brussels, London, Madrid, Copenhagen and Paris. On February 15, Jongho was announced to sing the OST "Wind" for the TvN drama Our Blooming Youth.

On February 15, the release of Limitless, their second Japanese single album, was announced for March 22. It will include the opening song they recorded for the anime Duel Masters WIN, "Limitless".

Other ventures

Endorsements 
On May 8, 2020, the Korean Ministry of Culture, Sports, and Tourism named Ateez as their 2020 promotional ambassador to help the promote Korean culture and tourism abroad. They participated in the "Overcome Together" relay challenge to encourage safer habits for avoiding COVID-19 and served as ambassador of the Talk Talk Korea Contest in 2020.

On January 28, 2021, Ateez filmed a commercial for the 'LG webOS TV'. On April 14, San was appointed as Public Relations Ambassador of Namhae, his hometown in South Gyeongsang Province, South Korea. On July 1, it was announced that members Hongjoong and Yunho would participate in the 2021 Pepsi Taste of Korea Campaign. They collaborated with K-pop artists Rain, Brave Girls and Monsta X on the song "Summer Taste", which was released on July 14.

On February 3, 2022, Ateez collaborated with online fashion store Poshmark. On July 14, Ateez was announced as global ambassadors for Korean cosmetics brand Mernel.

Philanthropy 
On August 31, 2020, it was announced that Ateez members Mingi and Yeosang would participate in Star Bookstore, a relay donation campaign where celebrities read children's books for children in disadvantaged situations. The audiobooks that each member recorded surpassed 10,000 views within one day of release, leading to a donation of ₩2 million from Happy Bean on behalf of the two members towards various welfare organisations in Korea.

On September 14, 2020, Ateez were announced as ambassadors for Polished Man, an initiative raising funds for trauma prevention and trauma recovery programs for young survivors of violence. Member Hongjoong had raised awareness for the campaign's cause since Ateez's debut by painting one of his nails, leading the group's fans to set up fundraising pages on Polished Man's website to raise hundreds of dollars in 2019 and early 2020, before Ateez officially partnered with the campaign. As of July 2021, funds raised through the partnership with Polished Man have exceeded $30,000.

On May 15, 2021, Ateez appeared on Identity 2021, a live stream fundraiser hosted by Amazon Music in honor of Asian Pacific American Heritage Month. The campaign raised over $20,000 towards Pacific Bridge Arts Musical Scholarships and the Gold House AAPI Community Fund.

In November 2022, in the wake of the Seoul Halloween crowd crush, Ateez donated ₩100 million to the Hope Bridge Korea Disaster Relief Association using the profits from their concert to support those affected by the accident.

Members
 Kim Hong-joong (김홍중) – leader, rapper, composer
 Park Seong-hwa (박성화) – vocalist
 Jeong Yun-ho (정윤호) – performance, vocalist
 Kang Yeo-sang (강여상) – vocalist, performance
 Choi San (최산) – vocalist
 Song Min-gi (송민기) – rapper, performance
 Jung Woo-young (정우영) – performance, vocalist
 Choi Jong-ho (최종호) – vocalist

Discography

Korean albums
 Treasure EP.Fin: All to Action (2019)

Japanese albums
 Treasure EP.Extra: Shift the Map (2019)
 Into the A to Z (2021)

Filmography

Television

Online shows

Radio shows

Tours and concerts

 The Expedition Tour (2019)
 The Fellowship: Beginning of the End Tour (2022)
 The Fellowship: Break The Wall Tour (2022)

Awards and nominations

Listicles

References

External links
 Official website 

K-pop music groups
South Korean boy bands
Musical groups established in 2018
South Korean pop music groups
KQ Entertainment artists
MTV Europe Music Award winners
2018 establishments in South Korea
Japanese-language singers of South Korea